Shane Ellen (born 1 January 1973) is a former Australian rules footballer who played in the Australian Football League (AFL).

Bulldogs career
Ellen, a Footscray local, made his debut with the Bulldogs in 1993, and when he left in 1995 he had played just 11 games for 1 goal. He was then delisted, before being selected by the Adelaide Football Club in the 1996 Pre-season Draft.

Adelaide career
He arrived at the Crows in 1996 and was a largely unheralded player. That was until the 1997 AFL Grand Final against St Kilda. This proved to be a defining moment in his career, until the journeyman's AFL career ended at the end of 2000, after 54 games and 15 goals with the club.

1997 Grand Final
In the 1997 Grand Final, Ellen was considered the unlikely hero for the Crows. In the first half he booted two goals from full-forward, playing there in place of the injured Tony Modra. He was then switched to the half-back line by coach Malcolm Blight, which proved to be an inspired move – Ellen kicked three of his five goals for the match after half-time.

This amazing performance was accentuated by the fact he had kicked just three goals in his previous 38 AFL matches. After the 1997 Grand Final, he kicked eight more goals for the remainder of his career.

Statistics

|-
|- style="background-color: #EAEAEA"
! scope="row" style="text-align:center" | 1993
|style="text-align:center;"|
| 47 || 4 || 0 || 1 || 22 || 9 || 31 || 6 || 2 || 0.0 || 0.3 || 5.5 || 2.3 || 7.8 || 1.5 || 0.5
|-
! scope="row" style="text-align:center" | 1994
|style="text-align:center;"|
| 20 || 0 || — || — || — || — || — || — || — || — || — || — || — || — || — || —
|- style="background-color: #EAEAEA"
! scope="row" style="text-align:center" | 1995
|style="text-align:center;"|
| 20 || 7 || 1 || 2 || 36 || 7 || 43 || 8 || 3 || 0.1 || 0.3 || 5.1 || 1.0 || 6.1 || 1.1 || 0.4
|-
! scope="row" style="text-align:center" | 1996
|style="text-align:center;"|
| 13 || 17 || 2 || 1 || 128 || 78 || 206 || 55 || 17 || 0.1 || 0.1 || 7.5 || 4.6 || 12.1 || 3.2 || 1.0
|- style="background-color: #EAEAEA"
! scope="row" style="text-align:center;" | 1997
|style="text-align:center;"|
| 13 || 10 || 5 || 2 || 70 || 45 || 115 || 39 || 14 || 0.5 || 0.2 || 7.0 || 4.5 || 11.5 || 3.9 || 1.4
|-
! scope="row" style="text-align:center;" | 1998
|style="text-align:center;"|
| 13 || 17 || 7 || 9 || 122 || 46 || 168 || 45 || 21 || 0.4 || 0.5 || 7.2 || 2.7 || 9.9 || 2.6 || 1.2
|- style="background-color: #EAEAEA"
! scope="row" style="text-align:center" | 1999
|style="text-align:center;"|
| 13 || 6 || 1 || 1 || 22 || 10 || 32 || 11 || 2 || 0.2 || 0.2 || 3.7 || 1.7 || 5.3 || 1.8 || 0.3
|-
! scope="row" style="text-align:center" | 2000
|style="text-align:center;"|
| 13 || 4 || 0 || 3 || 28 || 5 || 33 || 13 || 1 || 0.0 || 0.8 || 7.0 || 1.3 || 8.3 || 3.3 || 0.3
|- class="sortbottom"
! colspan=3| Career
! 65
! 16
! 19
! 428
! 200
! 628
! 177
! 60
! 0.2
! 0.3
! 6.6
! 3.1
! 9.7
! 2.7
! 0.9
|}

References

Adelaide Football Club players
Adelaide Football Club Premiership players
Western Bulldogs players
Melton Football Club players
Coburg Football Club players
Australian rules footballers from Victoria (Australia)
1973 births
Living people
Two-time VFL/AFL Premiership players